The Jurca MJ-8 1-Nine-0 is a sport aircraft designed in France in the mid 1970s as a replica of the Focke-Wulf Fw 190 and marketed for homebuilding. It is one of many wooden homebuilt designs from Romanian born designer Marcel Jurca. Jurca was a Henschel Hs 129 pilot in World War II who started designing aircraft after building a Jodel. Plans for two versions were produced, the MJ-8, at 3/4 scale, and the MJ-80, at full-scale. Construction throughout is of wood, and the builder may choose to complete the aircraft with either a single seat or two seats in tandem. The plans were marketed by Falconar and later Jurca Plans West.

At least two MJ-8s have flown: one powered by a Lycoming IO-540 in the USA and one powered by a Russian M14P radial built in Switzerland but now in New Zealand.

As of July 2017 one MJ-80 is known to have flown, a Pratt & Whitney R-1830-powered example in Germany.

Variants
 MJ-8 - 3/4 scale version
 MJ-80 - full-scale version. Powered with a 310 hp Continental GIO-470 or equivalent.

Specifications (typical MJ-8)

See also

References
 
 1-Nine-0 on manufacturer's website

1970s French sport aircraft
Homebuilt aircraft
Replica aircraft
Jurca aircraft
Low-wing aircraft
Single-engined tractor aircraft
Focke-Wulf Fw 190